Hatirjheel (lit. Lake of Elephant) is a lakefront in Dhaka, Bangladesh. Before 2009, It was a slum area that has been transformed into a recreation area as well as an alternate way to ease traffic congestion.

The area was constructed under Bangladesh Army and the Special Works Organization. It is now a popular recreational spot for residents of Dhaka.

History
Legend has it that the elephants of Dhaka's Pilkhana used to take baths in these wetlands – hence the name Hatirjheel. Architect Iqbal Habib, who heads the consultant firm of the Hatirjheel-Begunbari development project, said that the Bhawal Raja used to keep his tamed elephants at Pilkhana. He said that the elephants were taken to the wetlands through the Elephant Road and Hatirpool.

Location
Hatirjheel is located at the centre of the capital city, Dhaka. Hatirjheel is located at coordinates . The area stretches from Sonargaon Hotel in the south to all the way to Banasree in the north. The place is surrounded by Tejgaon, Gulshan, Badda, Rampura, Banasree, Niketon, and Maghbazar, and it made the transportation of the people living near these areas much easier.

Development
Building the entire site required 19.71 billion (19,710 million) taka and an area of 302 acres. From this, 10.48 billion (10,480 million) taka was spent in acquiring the site itself. 46% of the area belongs to RAJUK, which includes an area of 81 acres for a "court of walks", 141 acres for public lands and 1 acre for BTV. The project was first permitted in October 2007, and was said to be completed within three years (by June 2010). However, the construction began in December 2008, which took a further half year for expanding it. The total funds for creating the project included the money of RAJUK (1,113.7 billion taka), LGED (2,760 million) and WASA (866.95 million).

It has an area of 311.79 acres while some 8.80 kilometer service road and some 8.80 kilometer expressway have been constructed under the project. The entire area of Hatirjheel is designed with about four main and four minor bridges (viaducts), several overpasses (flyovers), footbridges (overbridges), 8.80 kilometres of footpaths, 9.80 kilometers walkway, one children's park, and 13 viewing decks. There are sitting arrangements for pedestrians by the riverside. A lake flows through the heart of the project with a 16 km road surrounding it. During the dry season, the Hatirjheel lake can hold approximately 3.06 billion liters of water, and during the rainy season about 4.81 billion liters of water, making it the largest body of water inside the capital of Bangladesh.

Facilities
After completion, Hatirjheel is considered by many to be one of the most notable places in Dhaka, and hence, turned into one of the most favourite recreational places for the city dwellers and tourists. Since congested buildings permeate most of Dhaka, leaving few open places for people to feel the fresh air, Hatirjheel attracts the city dwellers with its abundant fresh air. Bus and water taxi services are available for transport within the area. At night, lights of different hues illuminate the entire Hatirjheel, especially on the bridges. The area has been decorated with flowering shrubs and trees. Numerous tourists and pedestrians visit the site every evening to enjoy the reflection of light and the fresh air.

In the afternoon people, especially couples, visit Hatirjheel for recreational purposes. There are restaurants and venues for small-scale family picnics. Boat rides are also available for both recreational purposes and transportation. The area has an amphitheatre with a capacity to accommodate 2,000 visitors. There is a 120-meter long colourful musical fountain with a time-controlled sound wave and musical tracks, making it a tri-dimensional structure.

Inauguration

The Hatirjheel-Begunbari project was inaugurated on January 2, 2013, by the Prime Minister Sheikh Hasina at 11 am. The Hatirjheel project opened for the general use of people after the inauguration. On the occasion of the inauguration, Hatirjheel was decorated with multi-coloured flowers and flattering flags of different hues. In the evening of the inaugural day, the city dwellers viewed a spectacular display of fireworks in the vicinity of the project.

Gallery

References

External links

 Lake map - Wikimapia
 Map - Google Maps

Buildings and structures in Dhaka
Lakes in Dhaka city
Road bridges in Bangladesh